The Log Cabin Motel, also known as Camp O' The Pines in Pinedale, Wyoming, United States, was built in 1929 as a cabin camp to serve growing numbers of automobile-borne tourists bound for Yellowstone National Park. The camp was owned by Walter Scott, who operated the Pinedale Cash Store.  Contrary to the name, Scott allowed customers to buy on credit, and some worked off their credit by building cabins at Camp O' The Pines.  Unlike many auto camps, the camp was open year-round, with cabins often rented by the month by local people.

The seven cabins were arranged in a semicircle around a residence and a bath house.  Indoor plumbing was added to the cabins in the 1930s and 1940s. The residence and bath house were converted into cabins, and a matching cabin was added in 2007.

See also
 List of motels

References

External links
Log Cabin Motel
Log Cabin Motel at the Wyoming State Historic Preservation Office

Buildings and structures in Sublette County, Wyoming
Historic districts on the National Register of Historic Places in Wyoming
Hotel buildings completed in 1929
Hotel buildings on the National Register of Historic Places in Wyoming
Rustic architecture in Wyoming
Motels in the United States
National Register of Historic Places in Sublette County, Wyoming